Hauptmann is a crater on Mercury. It has a diameter of 118 kilometers. Its name was adopted by the International Astronomical Union (IAU) in 1985. Hauptmann is named for the German playwright Gerhart Hauptmann, who lived from 1862 to 1946.

A dark spot of low reflectance material (LRM) is present to the southwest of Hauptmann.

Views

References

Impact craters on Mercury